Abdullino (Abdulla) is a rural locality (a village) in Kuzbayevsky Selsoviet of Burayevsky District, Bashkortostan, Russia. Its population is 58 as of 2010.

Geography 
Abdullino is located 20 km north of Burayevo (the district's administrative centre) by road. Bustanayevo is the nearest rural locality.

Ethnicity 
The village is inhabited by Bashkirs and others.

References 

Rural localities in Burayevsky District